Atlanta is a genus of pelagic marine gastropod molluscs in the family Atlantidae.

Species
Species in the genus Atlanta include:

 Protatlanta souleyeti (Smith, 1888) - type species and the only Recent species in the genus Protatlanta
 Protatlanta mediterranea Issel, 1915 - recent, sometimes is this considered as separate species
 † Protatlanta rotundata (Gabb, 1873)

References

Atlantidae